François Barrer (born 8 June 1993 in Reims) is a French long-distance runner. He won a gold medal in the 5000 metres at the 2017 Summer Universiade.

International competitions

Personal bests

Outdoor
1000 metres – 2:24.2 (Monaco 2013)
1500 metres – 3:42.23 (Bruay-la-Buissiere 2017)
3000 metres – 8:06.19 (Oordegem 2014)
5000 metres – 13:27.69 (Carquefou 2017)
10 kilometres – 30:17 (Paris 2015)
3000 metres steeplechase – 9:11.41 (Reims 2017)
Indoor
1500 metres – 3:49.96 (Nantes 2017)
3000 metres – 8:06.31 (Reims 2015)

References

1993 births
Living people
French male long-distance runners
Sportspeople from Reims
Universiade medalists in athletics (track and field)
Universiade gold medalists for France
Medalists at the 2017 Summer Universiade